Victor Reux (December 3, 1929 – June 3, 2016) was a French and Saint Pierre and Miquelon politician and teacher. He served in the French Senate, representing the overseas collectivity of Saint Pierre and Miquelon, for nine years from October 1, 1995, until September 30, 2004.

Reux, a fixture in Saint Pierre and Miquelon politics, was a teacher before entering politics in the early 1980s.  During his political career, Reux served on the French Commission of UNESCO, a local municipal councilor, and a member of the departmental council of Saint Pierre and Miquelon. He was also a member of the l’assemblée des parlementaires de la Francophonie and the France-Canada Friendship Group.

Reux died on June 3, 2016, at the age of 86.

References

1929 births
2016 deaths
Saint Pierre and Miquelon politicians
Saint Pierre and Miquelon educators
French Senators of the Fifth Republic
Union for a Popular Movement politicians
Senators of Saint Pierre and Miquelon